Take the 10 is a 2017 American black comedy film written and directed by Chester Tam and starring Josh Peck, Tony Revolori, Emily Chang, Cleopatra Coleman, Kevin Corrigan and Andy Samberg. The film was released on Netflix on January 20, 2017.

Cast  
Josh Peck as Chris
Tony Revolori as Chester Tamborghini
Emily Chang as Carmen
Cleopatra Coleman as Sahara
Kevin Corrigan as Danny Bryant
Andy Samberg as Johnny 
Xavi Israel as Rico 
Emily Kuroda as Patti
Stella Maeve as Brooke
Paul McCrane as Carey Winters
DaJuan Rippy as Denzel
Jordan Rock as Greg
Chester Tam as Jay Morrison
Carlos Alazraqui as Carlo
Fernando Colunga as Erick
Exie Booker as Officer Peterson
Mike Bradecich as Tony
Ashanti Brown as Gale 
Fred Armisen as Driver

Plot
A day in the life of two best friends, a drug dealer, and a store manager collide at a hip-hop concert in the Inland Empire.

Release
The film was released on Netflix on January 20, 2017.

References

External links
 
 

2017 films
2017 black comedy films
American black comedy films
English-language Netflix original films
2010s English-language films
2010s American films